Morgan Treherne (6 August 1803 – 11 July 1867), known as Morgan Thomas until 11 November 1856, was a British Conservative Party politician.

Early life and family
Then Thomas was the second son of Rees Goring and Sarah Goring (née Sarah Hovel). He studied at Tooting School in Cheam, Surrey, and then went on to study at Trinity College, Cambridge where he graduated with a BA in 1824, and an MA in 1827. He was then called to the Bar at Inner Temple in 1827.

He married Louisa Frances Dalrymple, only child of John Apsley Dalrymple, in 1835, but they had issue. On 11 November 1856, he eschewed the surname 'Thomas', replacing it by deed poll with the old family of 'Treherne'.

Political career
Treherne stood multiple times for parliament during his life – in 1832, 1833, 1835, 1837, 1857, and 1859 – contesting Coventry each time. He was eventually elected for the seat at a by-election in 1863 and held the seat until his death in 1867.

Other activities
Treherne was also a Justice of the Peace for Sussex and Deputy Lieutenant of Surrey.

References

External links
 

Conservative Party (UK) MPs for English constituencies
Deputy Lieutenants of Surrey
UK MPs 1859–1865
UK MPs 1865–1868
1803 births
1867 deaths
Members of Parliament for Coventry